The Tape is the debut studio album by American rapper Kid Capri. It was released on February 19, 1991, by Cold Chillin’/Warner Bros. Records. Recording sessions took place at Power Play Studios in Long Island City. Production was handled by Biz Markie with Cool V. The album peaked at No. 87 on the Top R&B/Hip-Hop Albums in the United States. The album spawned two singles: "Apollo" and "Joke's on You, Jack".

Track listing

Personnel
David Anthony Love, Jr. – main artist
Dee Joseph Garner – featured artist (track 6), album coordinator
TJ Swan – vocals (track 3)
Anton Pukshansky – bass (track 1)
Ivan 'Doc' Rodriguez – keyboards (track 3), engineering
Marcel Theo Hall – producer, executive producer
Vaughan Lee – arranger, co-producer
JoDee Stringham – art direction, design
Mark Seliger – photography

Charts

References

External links

1991 debut albums
Kid Capri albums
Cold Chillin' Records albums